The Magnificent Rogue is a 1946 American comedy film directed by Albert S. Rogell and written by Dane Lussier and Sherman L. Lowe. The film stars Lynne Roberts, Warren Douglas, Gerald Mohr, Stephanie Bachelor, Adele Mara and Grady Sutton. The film was released on November 7, 1946, by Republic Pictures.

Plot
While he is away serving in the armed forces, Steve Morgan's advertising agency is being run by his wife, who goes by her maiden name Pat Brown so clients won't just think of her as the boss's wife. Pat loses a big account and anxiously wants to sign up Smoothies cigarettes, owned by playboy Mark Townley.

Steve returns home and wants Pat to quit work. She believes that Townley will sign only with her, so colleague Vera Lane talks them into a wager over which one will succeed. Townley believes that Pat is unmarried and begins romancing her, upsetting burlesque performer Sugar Lee, his girlfriend.

Complications arise as Vera secretly schemes to ruin Pat's plans, helping her own advancement in the agency. Steve and Sugar end up together at a nightclub where they are spotted by Pat, who mistakenly believes her husband is cheating on her. Steve gets fed up and decides to leave town, but Sugar's able to convince Pat of the truth. The couple reunites as they leave together on the train.

Cast   
Lynne Roberts as Pat Brown Morgan
Warren Douglas as Steve Morgan
Gerald Mohr as Mark Townley
Stephanie Bachelor as Vera Lane
Adele Mara as Sugar Lee
Grady Sutton as George Sheffield
Donia Bussey as Mrs. Sheffield
Ruth Lee as Lita Andrews
Charles Coleman as Jefferson O'Neal
Dorothy Christy as Clerk

References

External links 
 

1946 films
1940s English-language films
American comedy films
1946 comedy films
Republic Pictures films
Films directed by Albert S. Rogell
American black-and-white films
1940s American films